Barking and Dagenham London Borough Council in London, England is elected every four years. Since the last boundary changes in 2002, 51 councillors have been elected from 17 wards.

Political control
The first election to the council was held in 1964, initially operating as a shadow authority until the new system came into full effect the following year. Since the first election to the council in 1964 political control of the council has been held by the Labour Party:

Leadership
The leaders of the council since 1965 have been:

Council elections
 1964 Barking London Borough Council election
 1968 Barking London Borough Council election
 1971 Barking London Borough Council election
 1974 Barking London Borough Council election
 1978 Barking London Borough Council election (boundary changes reduced the number of seats by one)
 1982 Barking and Dagenham London Borough Council election
 1986 Barking and Dagenham London Borough Council election
 1990 Barking and Dagenham London Borough Council election
 1994 Barking and Dagenham London Borough Council election (boundary changes increased the number of seats by three)
 1998 Barking and Dagenham London Borough Council election
 2002 Barking and Dagenham London Borough Council election (boundary changes took place but the number of seats remained the same)
 2006 Barking and Dagenham London Borough Council election
 2010 Barking and Dagenham London Borough Council election
 2014 Barking and Dagenham London Borough Council election
 2018 Barking and Dagenham London Borough Council election
 2022 Barking and Dagenham London Borough Council election

Borough result maps

By-election results

1964–1968
There were no by-elections.

1968–1971
There were no by-elections.

1971–1974

1974–1978
There were no by-elections.

1978–1982

The by-election was called following the death of Cllr. Bertie E. Roycraft.

The by-election was called following the death of Cllr. Julia H. Engwell.

The by-election was called following the death of Cllr. William E. Bellamy.

1982–1986

The by-election was called following the death of Cllr. Albert E. Ball.

The by-election was called following the resignation of Cllr. William Hibble.

The by-election was called following the resignation of Cllr. Edward J. Reed.

1986–1990

The by-election was called following the death of Cllr. Alan R. Beadle.

The by-election was called following the death of Cllr. Ernest A. Turner.

The by-election was called following the resignation of Cllr. Donald I. Pepper.

The by-election was called following the resignation of Cllr. Patricia A. Twomey.

The by-election was called following the resignation of Cllr. Abdul M. Khokhar.

1990–1994

The by-election was called following the resignation of Cllr. Trevor A. Watson.

The by-election was called following the death of Cllr. Raymond Gowland.

1994–1998

The by-election was called following the resignation of Cllr. Alastair Hannah-Rogers.

The by-election was called following the death of Cllr. Joseph A. Butler.

1998–2002

The by-election was called following the resignation of Cllr. Terence P. Power.

The by-election was called following the resignation of Cllr. Stephen W. Churchman.

The by-election was called following the death of Cllr. Colin T. W. Pond.

2002–2006

The by-election was called following the death of Cllr. Susan Bramley.

The by-election was called following the death of Cllr. Lawrence Bunn and the resignation of Cllr. Sidney Summerfield.

The by-election was called following the death of Cllr. Daniel J. Felton

The by-election was called following the death of Cllr. Robert Jeyes.

The by-election was called following the death of Cllr. Vera W. Cridland.

The by-election was called following the resignation of Cllr. Matthew W. Huggins.

The by-election was called following the resignation of Cllr. Darrin F. Best.

The by-election was called following the death of Cllr. John Wainwright.

The by-election was called following the resignation of Cllr. Daniel G. Kelley for health reasons.

2006–2010

The by-election was called following the resignation of Cllr. Sarah Baillie.

2010–2014

The by-election was called following the voiding of the election of Cllr. Louise Couling as she was ruled ineligible.

The by-election was called following the resignation of Cllr. Louise Couling for health reasons.

The by-election was called following the death of Cllr. Nirmal Gill.

2014–2018
There were no by-elections.

2018–2022

The by-election was called following the resignation of Cllr. Bill Turner.

2022–2026

Notes

References

External links
Barking and Dagenham Council
By-election results 

 
Politics of the London Borough of Barking and Dagenham